Río Seco Department is a department of Córdoba Province in Argentina.

The provincial subdivision has a population of about 12,635 inhabitants in an area of 6,754 km², and its capital city is Villa de María del Río Seco.

Settlements
Cerro Colorado
Chañar Viejo
Eufrasio Loza
Gutemberg
La Rinconada
Los Hoyos
Puesto de Castro
Rayo Cortado
Santa Elena
Sebastián Elcano
Villa Candelaria Norte
Villa de María del Río Seco

Departments of Córdoba Province, Argentina